Haikou Television (HKTV) is a television and radio station in Hainan, China. It broadcast three television channels, and 3 radio channels.

The station broadcasts a total of 11,000 hours annually, producing approximately 49 television programs. The signal strength covers 15 square kilometers.

Television channels
Haikou TV Comprehensive News Channel
Haikou TV Live Entertainment Channel
Haikou TV Economic Channel

References

External links
Website

Television networks in China
Mass media in Haikou
Organizations based in Haikou